In Syriac Christianity, the Fast of Nineveh (literally "Petition of the Ninevites") is a three-day fast starting the third Monday before Clean Monday from Sunday Midnight to Wednesday noon during participants usually abstain from all dairy foods and meat products. However, some observe the fast more rigorously and abstain from food and drink altogether from Sunday midnight to Wednesday after Holy Qurbana, which is celebrated before noon.

The three day fast of Nineveh commemorates the three days that Prophet Jonah spent inside the belly of the Great Fish and the subsequent fast and repentance of the Ninevites at the warning message of the prophet Jonah according to the bible. (Book of Jonah in the Bible).

Biblical basis 
The prophet Jonah appears in 2 Kings aka 4 Kings and is therefore thought to have been active around 786–746 BC. A possible scenario which facilitated the acceptance of Jonah's preaching to the Ninevites is that the reign of Ashur-dan III saw a plague break out in 765 BC, revolt from 763-759 BC and another plague at the end of the revolt. These documented events suggest that Jonah's words were given credibility and adhered to, with everyone allegedly cutting off from food and drinks, including animals and children. However Jonah is not a historically attested figure, and does not appear in contemporary written records of the time he is alleged to have lived.

History

Church of the East 
As the patriarch Joseph (552–556/567 AD) had been deposed, Ezekiel  was selected to replace him in the Church of the East, much to the joy of the emperor Khusrow Anushirwan who loved him and held him in high esteem. A mighty plague devastated Mesopotamia with the Sassanian authorities unable to curb its spread and the dead littered the streets, in particular the imperial capital Seleucia-Ctesiphon The metropolitans of the East Syriac ecclesiastical provinces of Adiabene ( "Ḥdāyaḇ", encompassing Arbil, Nineveh, Hakkari and Adhorbayjan) and Beth Garmaï ( "Bēṯ Garmai", encompassing Kirkuk and the surrounding region) called for services of prayer, fasting and penitence to be held in all the churches under their jurisdiction, as was believed to have been done by the Ninevites following the preaching of the prophet Jonah.

Following its success, the tradition has been strictly adhered to every year by the members of the Church of the East. Patriarchs of the Church of the East and Chaldean Catholic Church also called for extra fasts in an effort to alleviate the suffering and affliction of those persecuted by ISIS in the region of Nineveh and the rest of the Middle East.

Other Churches 
Although the fast of the Ninevites was originally observed in the Church of the East. Marutha of Tikrit is known to have imposed the Fast of Nineveh in the West Syriac Church, and served as Maphrian of the Syriac Orthodox Maphrianate of the East until his death on 2 May 649. The Coptic Orthodox Church (since the time of Pope Abraham the Syrian) and the Ethiopian and Eritrean Orthodox Churches observe the fast.

References 

Christian fasting
Holidays based on the date of Easter
Oriental Orthodoxy
January observances
February observances